The 2014 WNBA draft is the league's annual process for determining which teams receive the rights to negotiate with players entering the league. The draft was held on April 14, 2014 at Mohegan Sun Arena in Uncasville, Connecticut at 8:00 pm EDT. The first round was shown on ESPN2 (HD), with the second and third rounds shown on ESPNU.

Draft lottery
The lottery selection to determine the order of the top four picks in the 2013 draft occurred on December 10, 2013. The draft lottery was televised (during SportsCenter at 6:30 pm ET).

Below were the chances for each team to get specific picks in the 2014 draft lottery, rounded to three decimal places:

Invited players
The WNBA announced on April 10, 2014 that 12 players had been invited to attend the draft. Unless indicated otherwise, all players listed are Americans who played at U.S. colleges.
  Natalie Achonwa, Notre Dame
 Stefanie Dolson, Connecticut
 Markeisha Gatling, N.C. State
 Chelsea Gray, Duke
 Bria Hartley, Connecticut
 Natasha Howard, Florida State
 Kayla McBride, Notre Dame
 Chiney Ogwumike, Stanford
 Shoni Schimmel, Louisville
 Meighan Simmons, Tennessee
 Odyssey Sims, Baylor
 Alyssa Thomas, Maryland

Transactions
 March 1, 2013: The Minnesota Lynx acquired the 2nd round pick of the Tulsa Shock in a trade that sent Candice Wiggins to Tulsa.
 March 11, 2014: The Indiana Fever acquired a first round pick from the Phoenix Mercury as part of the Erin Phillips/Lynetta Kizer transaction.
 March 31, 2014: The Connecticut Sun acquired a first round pick from the Los Angeles Sparks in exchange for Sandrine Gruda.
 April 14, 2014: The Connecticut Sun acquired Alyssa Thomas (the New York Liberty's pick in the first round), Kelsey Bone, and the Liberty's 2015 1st round draft pick, in exchange for Tina Charles
 April 14, 2014: The Washington Mystics acquired Bria Hartley (the Seattle Storm's first round pick) and Tianna Hawkins  for Crystal Langhorne

Key

Draft selections

Round 1

Round 2

Round 3

References

External links
 2014 WNBA draft board

Women's National Basketball Association Draft
Draft
WNBA Draft
WNBA Draft